Faresa Kapisi (born 23 July 1997) is an American Samoan sprinter. He competed in the 100 metres event at the 2013 World Championships in Athletics as barely a 16-year-old.

Personal bests

Competition record

References

1997 births
Living people
American Samoan male sprinters
Place of birth missing (living people)
World Athletics Championships athletes for American Samoa
Athletes (track and field) at the 2014 Summer Youth Olympics